Betsiboka River is a  long river in central-north Madagascar. It flows northwestward and empties to Bombetoka Bay, forming a large delta. It originates to the east of Antananarivo. The river is surrounded in mangroves. The river is distinctive for its red-coloured water, which is caused by river sediments. The river carries an enormous amount of reddish-orange silt to the sea. Much of this silt is deposited at the mouth of the river or in the bay.

It is dramatic evidence of the catastrophic erosion of northwestern Madagascar. Removal of the native forest for cultivation and pastureland during the past 50 years has led to massive annual soil losses approaching 250 metric tonnes per hectare (112 tons per acre) in some regions of the island, the largest amount recorded anywhere in the world. Several fish species are endemic to the river basin, including the three cichlids Paretroplus petiti, P. tsimoly and P. maculatus.

The Betsiboka's largest tributary, the Ikopa River, drains the capital city of Antananarivo.

See also
Betsiboka Bridge

References

External links
 Floods in Madagascar at NASA Earth Observatory
 Sediment Laden Drainages at Lunar and Planetary Institute, USRA
 NASA: Earth from Space

Rivers of Madagascar
Mozambique Channel